Kenneth Ian Albiston (11 November 1926 – 20 June 2018) was an Australian rules footballer who played for Richmond and Melbourne in the VFL.

The younger brother of Hawthorn forward Alec Albiston and Collingwood defender Harold Albiston, Ken played six seasons with Richmond before moving to Melbourne. He played in Melbourne's 1954 Grand Final loss to Footscray.

It was unusual in these days, for footballers to kick left and right footed, but Albiston learned to kick left footed while recovering from an injury to his right foot.

Prior to his  VFL career, Albiston served for seven months in the Royal Australian Air Force during the final year of World War II.

References

External links

DemonWiki profile

1926 births
2018 deaths
Australian rules footballers from Melbourne
Richmond Football Club players
Melbourne Football Club players
Melbourne High School Old Boys Football Club players
People educated at Melbourne High School
People from Balwyn, Victoria